Kazi Anis Ahmed (Bengali: কাজী আনিস আহমেদ) is a Bangladeshi writer, publisher and businessman. He is a co-founder and publisher of the English-language daily newspaper Dhaka Tribune, online news portal Bangla Tribune and the literary journal Bengal Lights. Ahmed is the author of three works of fiction. He is a co-director of the annual Bangladeshi literary festival, Dhaka Lit Fest.

Early life and education 
Kazi Anis Ahmed was born in Dhaka, Bangladesh. His father, Kazi Shahid Ahmed, is the founder and chairman of the Gemcon Group, and also a writer and novelist in the Bengali language.

Career

Writings 
Ahmed's first collection of short stories, Good Night, Mr. Kissinger, was published by The University Press Limited in Bangladesh and launched at the Hay Festival Dhaka, Bangladesh, in 2012. Ahmed's first novel, The World in My Hands, was published by Random House India in December 2013. The book is a political satire that charts the fate of two friends – a newspaper editor and a successful property developer – whose relationship is bitterly tested when they find themselves on opposite sides of a crisis that upends their country's social order. An early work of Ahmed's, Forty Steps (3 novella), has been published in a bi-langual edition by Bengal Lights. It was translated into Bengali by renowned translator Manabendra Bandyopadhyay.

Business 
Ahmed is a Director of the Gemcon Group, which was founded by his father, Kazi Shahed Ahmed, 1979. He has worked among other projects, for the Kazi and Kazi Tea Estate, Ltd. (KKTE). Ahmed Steered KKTE to emerge as the first successful organic tea estate in Bangladesh. He is co-founder of the Teatulia brand of Kazi and Kazi Tea, which sells in the USA, UK, Japan, China and other markets.

He is a co-founder of University of Liberal Arts Bangladesh and the Vice-President of the Board of Trustees of the same university.

Publishing 
Ahmed is also publisher of the English-language daily newspaper Dhaka Tribune, the Bengali-language online newspaper Bangla Tribune and the literary journal Bengal Lights. Ahmed contributes to international newspapers and journals such as The New York Times, TIME, The Guardian, Daily Beast, Wall Street Journal, and Nikkei Asian Review., and Politico He has co-curated special issues on Bangladesh in the literary journals Wasafiri and Granta. He wrote the opening essay for the Puterbaugh essay series in World Literature Today in December 2015 and was published in the Journal of Asian Studies in 2018.  Kazi Anis Ahmed, a writer and publisher of English daily Dhaka Tribune and online news portal Bangla Tribune, has been elected as the new president of PEN Bangladesh -- an international organization of writers, bloggers and journalists.

Literary works
Good Night, Mr. Kissinger (Unnamed Press, 2014), 
 The World in My Hands (Random House India, 2013)
 Forty Steps

See also
List of Bangladeshi writers
Bangladeshi English literature

References

External links
Official Website

Newspaper publishers (people)
1970 births
Living people
Bangladeshi businesspeople
Bangladeshi publishers (people)